Paul Davies became the Leader of the Opposition in Wales after being elected as Leader of the Welsh Conservatives on 27 June 2018 and named his Shadow Cabinet in July.

Between May 2016 and December 2018 the senior tier of ministers were referred to as Cabinet Secretaries and the junior tier as Ministers, from the formation of the first Drakeford government they reverted to their previous titles of Cabinet Ministers and Deputy Ministers respectively and the same applied to Conservative shadow ministers.

The Davies Shadow Cabinet was dissolved upon Paul Davies's resignation on 23 January 2021.

Background 

Following the resignation of Andrew R. T. Davies in 2018, the Welsh Conservatives leadership election was contested.

Nominations opened on 29 June 2018 and candidates needed a total of four nominations from Conservative AMs, including themselves, to stand. AMs Russell George, David Melding, and Darren Millar all declined to stand.

There were two candidates who reached the ballot: Deputy Leader and the then-Interim Leader Paul Davies, and former Shadow Minister for Tourism, Culture and the Welsh Language, Suzy Davies.

The South Wales Argus described Paul Davies as having the support of "most of the big hitters in the party" including AMs Darren Millar and Nick Ramsay, former Secretary of State for Wales Stephen Crabb, and the then Chair of the Welsh Affairs Select Committee, David Davies. Suzy Davies was endorsed by AMs Janet Finch-Saunders, Mark Isherwood, and David Melding.

Voting opened on 15 August 2018 and in the outcome, the former obtained 68.1% of the votes of members. The count and declaration as held on 6 September 2018.

Between April 2020 and July 2020 the Secretary of State for Wales, Simon Hart, and the Leader of Monmouthshire County Council Peter Fox, attended Cabinet to support the response to the Coronavirus outbreak in Wales.

In September 2020 David Melding, a moderate and pro-devolution Tory quit his role in the shadow cabinet, Shadow Counsel General & Shadow Minister for Culture & Communications. He made his decision of leaving the front bench permanently after "misgivings for some time" over the party's approach to Brexit, citing that it will lead to the union breaking up. He quit his job the same day as the UK Government introduced in Parliament the Internal Market Bill.

Leadership election

Members

See also 

 Drakeford government
 Members of the 5th Senedd

References 

2018 establishments in Wales
Cabinets established in 2018